Fencing at the 2007 Southeast Asian Games took place at the National Synchrotron Research Centre at the Suranaree University of Technology in Amphoe Mueang Nakhon Ratchasima, Nakhon Ratchasima Province, Thailand.

Medal tally

Medalists

Men

Women

External links
Southeast Asian Games Official Results

2007 Southeast Asian Games events
2007
Southeast Asian Games
International fencing competitions hosted by Thailand